Frederick W. Hawley (28 July 1890 – 1954) was an English professional footballer born in Derby who made 305 appearances in the Football League playing for Sheffield United, Coventry City, Birmingham, Swindon Town, Bristol City, Brighton & Hove Albion and Queens Park Rangers. He made guest appearances for Derby County, Notts County F.C., Birmingham and Nottingham Forest during the First World War.

References

1890 births
1954 deaths
Footballers from Derby
English footballers
Association football midfielders
Derby Midland F.C. players
Sheffield United F.C. players
Coventry City F.C. players
Birmingham City F.C. players
Swindon Town F.C. players
Bristol City F.C. players
Brighton & Hove Albion F.C. players
Queens Park Rangers F.C. players
English Football League players
Derby County F.C. wartime guest players
Notts County F.C. wartime guest players
Birmingham City F.C. wartime guest players
Nottingham Forest F.C. wartime guest players
Date of death missing
Place of death missing